Vincent Santiago Georges Fernandez (born 19 September 1986, in Marseille) is a French footballer; he plays either as a right-back or central defender. Currently, he plays in the Championnat National for Fréjus Saint-Raphaël.

After graduating from the highly successful Nottingham Forest Academy, Fernandez made his professional debut against Swansea City in the 2005–06 season.

On 24 November 2006, he joined Blackpool on loan until 1 January 2007. Shortly after this loan ended, he was loaned out to Grays Athletic. He was also loaned to Wycombe Wanderers earlier in the season. He was released by Forest in May 2007.

References

External links
 Career summary by playerhistory.com

1986 births
Living people
French footballers
French expatriate footballers
Expatriate footballers in England
French people of Spanish descent
Nottingham Forest F.C. players
Wycombe Wanderers F.C. players
Blackpool F.C. players
Grays Athletic F.C. players
National League (English football) players
English Football League players
ÉFC Fréjus Saint-Raphaël players
Association football defenders